Alfonso Bonafede (born 2 July 1976) is an Italian lawyer and politician who has served as the Italian Minister of Justice since 1 June 2018. A lawyer by profession, Bonafede has also served as a member of the Chamber of Deputies from 15 March 2013 until 12 October 2022.

Early life
Born in Mazara del Vallo, a town in Sicily, Bonafede studied law at the University of Florence and the University of Pisa; in 2006, he earned a PhD from the University of Pisa.

Political career
Bonafede was first introduced to politics by Beppe Grillo, standing as the Five Star Movement's candidate for Mayor of Florence in 2009, garnering 1.82% of the vote.

In the Italian general election in 2013, he was elected to the Chamber of Deputies as a member of the Five Star Movement, representing the XII district of Tuscany; Bonafede was reelected in the Italian general election of 2018.

During the formation of government following the 2018 election, his name was put forth as a possible prime minister.

Instead, Bonafede was sworn in as Minister of Justice on 1 June 2018, as a member of the Conte Cabinet, and again on 5 September 2019, as a member of the second Conte Cabinet.

See also
 Conte I Cabinet

References

21st-century Italian politicians
Conte I Cabinet
Conte II Cabinet
1976 births
Living people
People from Mazara del Vallo
University of Florence alumni
University of Pisa alumni
Five Star Movement politicians
Deputies of Legislature XVII of Italy
Deputies of Legislature XVIII of Italy
Italian Ministers of Justice